Rome today is a popular tourist destination, due to its archaeological and artistical significance, as well as its unique traditions, its panoramic views, and its parks. Among the most significant resources: plenty of museums – (Capitoline Museums, the Vatican Museums, Galleria Borghese, and a great many others)—aqueducts, fountains, churches, palaces, historical buildings, the monuments and ruins of the Roman Forum, and the Catacombs. Rome is the 2nd most visited city in the EU, after Paris, and receives an average of 7–10 million tourists a year, which sometimes doubles on holy years. The Colosseum (4 million tourists) and the Vatican Museums (4.2 million tourists) are the 39th and 37th (respectively) most visited places in the world, according to a recent study. In 2005 the city registered 19.5 million of global visitors, up of 22.1% from 2001. In 2006, Rome was visited by 6.03 million international tourists, reaching 8th place in the ranking of the world's 150 most visited cities. The city has also been nominated 2007's fourth most desirable city to visit in the world, according to lifestyle magazine Travel + Leisure, after Florence, Buenos Aires and Bangkok. Rome is the city with the most monuments in the world. Like other Italian cities, Rome charges a tourism tax which contributes towards the maintenance of public transportation and infrastructure. It ranges from €3 to €7 per person, per night, based on the hotel or other type of accommodation used (children under 10 years old are exempt, and the tax no longer applies after 10 days).

History of Rome

Rome has been one of the world's most visited cities for the past two millennia. In the Roman times, Rome was the centre and the most powerful city of Western Civilization, ruling all the Mediterranean, Northern Africa, England and parts of the Middle East. Afterwards, it became one of the most important cities in Christianity, since the pope, the head of the Roman Catholic Church, resided and still lives in Rome. It became a worldwide centre of pilgrimage, and later in the Renaissance, as the city became a major European capital of the arts, education, philosophy and trade, it became an important crossroads for bankers, artists and other people in general. 

Later, in the 17th, 18th and 19th centuries, the city was one of the centres of the Grand Tour, when wealthy, young English aristocrats visited the city to learn about ancient Roman culture, art, philosophy and architecture. Towards the 1840s, the first sort of mass-tourism began, and Rome became an extremely popular attraction for not only British people, but for people of all around the world. The number of tourists, however, fell dramatically towards the 1870s, when Rome became a battle-ground for revolutionaries and one of the homes of the Risorgimento, and remained like that except for a brief period in the 1920s. 

However, since Rome escaped World War II relatively unscathed, unlike Milan or Naples, it became an extremely popular and fashionable city in the 1950s and 60s, when numerous films such as Roman Holiday, Ben Hur and more famously La Dolce Vita were filmed in the city. Numerous stars, actors, actresses and celebrities, such as Federico Fellini, Audrey Hepburn, Gregory Peck and Anita Ekberg, lived or stayed in Rome, especially along its Via Veneto, where most major Roman hotels were and still are found. 

After a brief fall in the number of tourists in the 1980s (due to some terrorist activity led by the Red Brigades and political scandals), the city has now become one of the world's most popular tourist attractions.

Most popular tourist attractions
Rome's two most popular tourist destinations are the Vatican Museums (with over 4.2 million tourists per year, making them the world's 37th most visited destination) and the Colosseum(with around 4 million tourists a year, making it the world's 39th most popular tourist destination). 

Other popular sites include St Peter's Basilica, the Forum Romanum, the Pantheon, the Trevi Fountain, the Spanish Steps, Via Condotti, Via Veneto, the Capitoline Museums, the Villa Borghese gardens, the Villa Giulia, Piazza Navona, the Basilica di Santa Maria Maggiore, the Archbasilica of Saint John Lateran, the Piazza del Popolo, the Castel Sant'Angelo, the Campo de' Fiori, the Quirinal Palace, the Lateran Palace and the Palazzo Barberini, among others.

Districts

Central Rome
Rome can be divided into several districts. The historical center (centro storico) is quite small, only around 4% of the city's area. This is mainly made up of Old Rome and Colosseum, as explained below:

 Modern Center—Where the hotels are, as well as shopping and dining along the Via Veneto; home to the Quirinale, Trevi fountain, Barberini, Castro Pretorio, and Repubblica areas.
 Historic quarter—the center of the Roman medieval and Renaissance periods, with several piazzas, cathedrals, the Pantheon, and plenty of dining; includes the Navona, Campo de' Fiori, and the Jewish Ghetto neighborhoods
 The Vatican—the Papal City State and its sights, relics, and museums, as well as the surrounding Italian neighborhood, Vaticano
 Colosseum—the heart of ancient Rome, the Colosseum, the Roman Forum, the Forum of Augustus, the Forum and Markets of Trajan, the Capitoline and its museums
 North Centre—situated in the north part of Rome, home to the Villa Borghese, the Spanish Steps, and the upper-class neighborhoods of Parioli and Salario
 Trastevere—the land to the south of the Vatican, on the west bank of the Tiber River
 Aventino-Testaccio—there are several restaurants in the area.
 Esquilino-San Giovanni—south of Termini, with an indoor market, Piazza Vittorio Emanuele, and the Cathedral of Rome Saint John in Lateran
 Nomentano—Municipio III, the neighborhoods "behind" the train station

Outskirts
 North—the vast suburban neighborhoods to the north of the center (Municipi 4, 15–20)
 South—home to extensive suburbs and fascist monumental architecture at EUR as well as catacombs and the Appian Way.(Municipi 5–13)
 Ostia—Rome's beach resort and the ruins of Ancient Rome's harbour.

Transport

Plane
Rome has two main international airports:
 Leonardo da Vinci/Fiumicino International Airport  (Rome Fiumicino) – Rome's main airport is modern and connected to the center of the city by public transportation.
 Ciampino International Airport  (Rome Ciampino,  – Located to the southeast of the capital, this is the city's low-cost airline airport, serving Easyjet, Ryanair and Wizzair flights, among others (see List of low-cost airlines in Europe). This small airport is closer to the city center than Fiumicino but has no direct train connection.

Airport transportation
From Leonardo da Vinci/Fiumicino airport, there are two train lines;Leonardo Express trains and Metropolitan train and COTRAL/Schiaffini operates buses from both airports to the city.

Taxis in Rome are white.

Train
Rome's main railway station is Termini Station.

Car
The city is ringed by a motorway, the GRA.oieq-p

Boat
Most cruise ships dock in Civitavecchia,
 Grimaldi Lines provides ferry service to/from Barcelona, Tunis, Toulon (France), Porto-Vecchio (Corsica).
 Moby provides service to/from Olbia, Sardinia.

Taxi
Taxis are the most expensive forms of travel in Rome. Roman taxis within the city walls run on meters.

Rome has several taxi cooperatives:
 La Capitale
 Roma Sud
 Cosmos

Public transport (ATAC)
Tickets for public transport must be bought before boarding (from a 'Tabacchi' or directly at the metro). Tickets for regular ATAC buses, Metro, and trams are the same fares and are compatible with each other.   ATAC polices the buses, Metro, and trams for people riding without tickets. Tickets must be validated, on entering the Metro station or on boarding a bus.

Roma Pass
The cost of a Roma pass is 34 euros and entitles holders to free admission to the first two museums and/or archaeological sites visited, full access to the public transport system, reduced tickets and discounts for any other following museums and sites visited, as well as exhibitions, music events, theatrical and dance performances and all other tourist services. There is also a pass called OMNIA Vatican and Rome that includes the services provided by Roma Pass, free entry to Vatican Museums and Sistine Chapel, fast track entry to St Peter's Basilica and hop-on-hop-off bus tour for 3 days. It costs 95 euros for 3 days.

Bus
Rome has an extensive bus system, which largely coalesces around the major transportation hub of Termini Station. In the historic core of the city, bus routes are largely confined to the main boulevards which transect the medieval and ancient neighborhoods, where roads are far too narrow for buses to access.

Tram

The tram routes mostly skirt the historic center, but there are stops near the Vatican, the Colosseum, and the Trastevere area.

Metro
There are three lines. Line A (red line) runs northwest past the Vatican, and south. Line B (blue line) runs southwest past the Colosseum and northeast, and it center forks into line B1. Line C (green line) runs from the Saint John's Lateran Basilica in the center to the city limits far east.

By commuter rail
There is a network of suburban rail lines that mostly connect to smaller towns and conurbations of Rome.

Problems
The poor state of Rome's infrastructure and public services, particularly garbage collection, have come under increasing scrutiny from tourists in recent years. The Guardian described the city as being in a "...perennial state of disrepair, from its rubbish-strewn streets, potholes, scrappy parks and medieval buildings marred by graffiti to closed metro stations and buses that either never come or occasionally combust." Waste disposal has been a critical problem for Roman authorities since the closure of the Malagrotta landfill in 2013. In June 2019, an acute heatwave in Rome led to health warnings from the medical community over risk of disease from rotting garbage, vermin, and household pets who come in contact with overflowing bins.

The tourist tax of between €3 and €7 per head, per night, which is the highest of any city in Europe, has been questioned because it is supposed to support maintenance and city services for tourists and Romans alike. 3 main metro stations were closed for repairs and maintenance as of April 2019: Spagna, Barberini and Repubblica. The latter has been closed since October 2018, after an escalator sped up suddenly and collapsed, injuring 24 people.

References

Bibliography (with license)

This article includes text copied from Wikivoyage which is published under the CC-BY-SA 3.0 licence.

 
.
Metropolitan City of Rome Capital
Tourist attractions in Lazio